Paranoid Castle is an alternative hip hop duo, consisting of Canadian producer Factor and American rapper Kirby Dominant. The duo released the first album, One Way Ticket, in 2004. The second album, Champagne Nightmares, was released on Fake Four Inc. in 2011. The two also collaborated on the song "Don't Give Up" off of Factor's 2013 album Woke Up Alone. The third album, Welcome to Success, was released on Fake Four Inc. in 2014.

Discography
Albums
 One Way Ticket (2004)
 Champagne Nightmares (2011)
 Welcome to Success (2014)

References

External links
  on Fake Four Inc.
 

Alternative hip hop groups
Hip hop duos
Musical groups from Saskatoon